The Hai-hak dance is a traditional Indian dance. It originated in Tripura, India.

Culture
Hai-Hak dance, an important dance of the Halam community of Tripura, is performed along with music at the site of worship to please the Goddess Lakshmi. Hai-Hak dance is usually performed after the harvest. Hai-Hak dance is characterised by exquisite grace and rhythm, reflecting the traditions inherited.

References

Dances of Tripura